Vincent–Beck Stadium (formerly Cardinal Field) is a ballpark located in Beaumont, Texas, on Jim Gilligan Way on the campus of Lamar University.  The stadium was built in 1969 and has a current capacity of 3,500 spectators.  It is the home stadium of the Lamar Cardinals baseball team.  It was also home to the Beaumont Golden Gators, a minor league Double-A Texas League affiliate of the San Diego Padres (1983–1986) as well as the Beaumont Bullfrogs of the Central Baseball League (1994).  The facility is named after former Major League Baseball coach Al Vincent and Bryan Beck, a former member of the Lamar University board of regents.
  
The ballpark hosted the Sun Belt Conference baseball tournament in 1993 and the Southland Conference baseball tournament in 2001, 2002, and 2006.

As the 2015 season began, the Cardinals had a 900-436–4 win–loss record at Vincent–Beck Stadium for a 67.3% winning record.

The stadium has been expanded several times and has had numerous renovations over its existence.  Ground breaking for installation of new turf at the stadium was held on October 22, 2018.  The project was completed in January, 2019.  Infield turf is Hellas Construction Fusion Triple play.  Outfield turf is Hellas Construction Fusion XP2.  Estimated cost for the project is $1.5 million.  Other improvements in 2019 were concentrated on the dugouts.  Protective netting was installed, and dugout drainage was improved.

Features
The stadium includes the following:

Lighting for night games
Twenty foot tall batter's eye in center field
Three foot brick wall extending from dugout to dugout behind home plate
Dugouts
Pressbox with two radio broadcast booths and additional media working space
700 chairback seats and total permanent capacity of 3,500
Locker Rooms including 35 custom built oak lockers
Players Lounge
All weather batting cages
Hellas Fusion turf - Infield (Fusion XP) and Outfield (Fusion XP2)
9,600 sq ft Indoor Practice Facility

Recovery from Hurricane Rita

Vincent–Beck Stadium was severely damaged by Hurricane Rita in 2005.  The following repairs and enhancements were made to the stadium before and during the 2006 baseball season.
 Replace press box – press box had been blown off its supports and was damaged
 Replace outfield fences – Fences were blown down
 Replace field lights
 Replace score board – new scoreboard was an enhancement and included a small video board
 Replace seats

On January 9, 2007, the Federal Emergency Management Agency awarded Lamar University $1.1 million to help with the uninsured portion of the loss.

Attendance
Source:

Top ten attendance

Note: Attendance is limited to 1991 season forward.  Attendance is not available for earlier seasons.

Yearly attendance

Below is a list of the attendance by year from the 1991 season forward.
Source:

 Note:  Games scheduled after March 11, 2020 cancelled due to COVID19 precautions.
As of the 2022 season.

Photo gallery

See also
 List of NCAA Division I baseball venues

References

External links
Facility information

Baseball in Beaumont, Texas
Baseball venues in Texas
Sports venues in Beaumont, Texas
Minor league baseball venues
College baseball venues in the United States
Lamar Cardinals baseball
Southland Conference Baseball Tournament venues
Lamar Cardinals and Lady Cardinals sports venues
1969 establishments in Texas
Sports venues completed in 1969